The MidSouth Rugby Football Union is the Local Area Union (LAU) for rugby union teams in Tennessee and portions of Arkansas under the True South Geographical Union of USA Rugby. The LAU also currently includes two teams located outside the core area of the LAU:
 One men's club is located in Huntsville, Alabama, in the northern portion of that state. The rest of that state is under the jurisdiction of the Deep South Rugby Football Union, the other LAU under the True South Union.
 One college team is in the Purchase area of Kentucky, a state that is not presently covered by any USA Rugby geographical union.

Men's clubs
 Clinch River
 Chattanooga
 Huntsville
 Johnson City
 Knoxville
 Maryville Highlanders
 Memphis Blues
 Nashville RFC

Women's clubs
 Memphis
 Nashville
 Knoxville

Men's college clubs
 Arkansas State University
 Bryan College
 Freed-Hardeman University
 Harding University
 Lee University
 University of Memphis
 Middle Tennessee State University
 Murray State University
 Sewanee: The University of the South
 University of Tennessee
 University of Tennessee at Martin
 Tennessee Tech
 Vanderbilt University

Women's college clubs
 Arkansas State University
 Middle Tennessee State University
 Sewanee: The University of the South
 University of Tennessee

Men's U19
 Spartan Rugby
 Cordova

Women's U19
 Spartan Rugby
 Maryville
 Karns
 Brighton

See also
True South Geographical Union
USA Rugby
Rugby union in the United States

References

External links
MidSouth Rugby Union
USA Rugby Official Site
IRB Official Site

Rugby union governing bodies in the United States